Events in the year 2013 in Kerala

Incumbents 
Governors of Kerala - H. R. Bhardwaj (additional charge till March), Nikhil Kumar (from March)

Chief minister of Kerala - Oommen Chandy

Events 

 April 1 - National Pension System came into force among state government employees of Kerala.
 March 10 - Lulu International Shopping Mall, Kochi inaugurated.
 May 5 - Kaumudy TV by Kerala Kaumudi group launched.
 May 15 - Malayali cricketer and Rajasthan Royals player S. Sreesanth arrested by Delhi Police in connection with 2013 Indian Premier League spot-fixing and betting case.
 June 10 - Ripper Jayanandan jail break from Central Prison, Poojappura.
 June 28 - Kerala Chief Minister Oommen Chandy's personal assistant Tenny Joppan arrested in connection with 2013 Kerala solar panel scam.
 September 9 - Kerala Police arrests  Ripper Jayanandan from Thrissur
 November 15 - Krishnagiri Stadium, Wayanad district inaugurated.
 December 1 - Kollam MEMU Shed commissioned.

Deaths 

 August 2 - V. Dakshinamoorthy, 93, Musician
 December 16 - Uthradom Thirunal Marthanda Varma, 91, titular head of Travancore royal family.

See also 

 History of Kerala
 2013 in India

References 

2010s in Kerala